Vohidahy is a rural municipality in Madagascar. It belongs to the district of Ambositra, which is a part of Amoron'i Mania Region.

Nature 
The Tapia forest of Vohidahy supplies the town with fruits, champignons and wild silk.

References  

Populated places in Amoron'i Mania